Martin Juhar (born 9 March 1988) is a retired Slovak football midfielder. He is universal midfielder who is able to play at right or left side.

Club career
Juhar made his Corgoň Liga debut in a 1–1 draw against Slovan Bratislava on 10 May 2008. He scored his first goal in a 1–1 draw against Senica on 22 April 2011.

After three years in Košice he has signed thee-year contract for Gambrinus liga club AC Sparta Prague on 14 June 2011. Juhar made his Sparta debut against 1860 Munich at pre-season training camp on 23 June 2011. In the league, he debuted against České Budějovice on 31 July 2011 and scored his first goal against Žižkov on 12 September 2011.

Career statistics

Honours

MFK Košice
 Slovak Cup (1): 2008–09

References

External links
 
 Sparta profile 
 MFK Košice profile
 
 HLSZ 

1988 births
Living people
Sportspeople from Košice
Association football midfielders
Slovak footballers
FC Lokomotíva Košice players
FC VSS Košice players
FC Zbrojovka Brno players
AC Sparta Prague players
SK Slavia Prague players
FC ViOn Zlaté Moravce players
Bruk-Bet Termalica Nieciecza players
FSV Zwickau players
Diósgyőri VTK players
Ekstraklasa players
Slovak Super Liga players
Czech First League players
3. Liga players
Nemzeti Bajnokság I players
Slovak expatriate footballers
Expatriate footballers in the Czech Republic
Expatriate footballers in Poland
Expatriate footballers in Germany
Expatriate footballers in Hungary
Slovak expatriate sportspeople in the Czech Republic
Slovak expatriate sportspeople in Poland
Slovak expatriate sportspeople in Germany
Slovak expatriate sportspeople in Hungary
Slovakia youth international footballers
Slovakia under-21 international footballers
Slovakia international footballers